Cosmic Crisp is an American apple with the variety designation WA 38. Breeding began in 1997 at the Washington State University (WSU) Tree Fruit Research and Extension Center in Wenatchee, Washington, and was initially overseen by Bruce Barritt. Kate Evans stepped in to complete the research after Barritt’s retirement from WSU.

Characteristics
The Cosmic Crisp is a cross between Honeycrisp and Enterprise apples. It is intended to have the texture and juiciness of the Honeycrisp, and the late-ripening behavior and long storage of the Enterprise. In breeding the variety, the focus was not on its appearance but on durability and shelf life. The Cosmic Crisp is characterized mainly by uniformly colored dark red skin, dense firm flesh, and an improved shelf life. The look of the apple's light lenticels against its wine-red skin reminded focus groups of a galaxy against a night sky, which led to it being named the Cosmic Crisp. It is the first widely grown apple variety developed in Washington.

The apple ripens at the same time as the Red Delicious and is expected by producers to replace a large part of Red Delicious stocks. The Cosmic Crisp apple was made available to consumers in 2019, after twenty years of development.

The New York Times described the apple as "dramatically dark, richly flavored and explosively crisp and juicy", making it "the most promising and important apple of the future". FoodRepublic.com called it "firmer than the Honeycrisp, but not too firm. And it is high in both sugar and acidity, making it far superior to the Red Delicious, Gala and Fuji varieties as well." Northwest Public Radio notes that Washington, which produces 70% of U.S. apples, is betting that the cultivar will "conquer" the market.

First plantings
The variety was first planted for commercial use in spring 2017, with twelve million trees pre-ordered by Washington state orchards. Interest in the cultivar was so high, the trees initially had to be distributed to apple farmers in a lottery held in 2014—WSU had planned to provide 300,000 saplings but were met with requests for four million. Within three years, over thirteen million Cosmic Crisp trees had been planted. Lawsuits emerged between WSU and a Seattle spin off, which the university claimed distributed over 100,000 trees improperly. WSU owns the Cosmic Crisp patent.

Promotion and marketing

A $10 million consumer launch of the product was funded by Washington-State agriculture promotion funds through the Washington Apple Commission and other agencies. The two taglines for the apple were "Imagine the Possibilities" and "The Apple of Big Dreams". It is said to be the largest campaign in apple industry history and included payments to social media influencers and a partnership with a touring children's production of Johnny Appleseed. The term "Cosmic Crisp" is trademarked.

The apples went on sale in Seattle grocery stores on December 1, 2019, beginning with a QFC store at University Village.

See also
 Crimson Delight, Washington State University's first apple variety, also known as WA 2

References

Further reading
 "I developed a sturdier, crisper, and yummier apple" by Bruce Barritt, as told to Amal Ahmed, Popular Science, May 18, 2018.

External links

 Official website

2019 in Washington (state)
American apples
Apple cultivars
Apple production in Washington (state)
Food and drink introduced in 2019
Washington State University